Diana Žiliūtė (born 28 May 1976 in Rietavas) is a Lithuanian racing cyclist who dominated women's road racing in the late 1990s.

She made her debut in the pro cycling ranks in the mid-1990s after winning the 1994 World Junior Road Race Championship. She rose to the top of women's cycling in 1998 when she won two World Road Cup races, the overall World Road Cup title, and capped the season by winning the World Road Race Championships and leading the UCI Women's Road World Rankings.

The following year (1999), she further demonstrated her all around prowess by winning the Grande Boucle, one of the hardest stage races in women's cycle racing history. This was followed in 2000 by a bronze medal at the Summer Olympics.

For her achievements, Žiliūtė was awarded the Order of Gediminas, a Lithuanian state honor.

Palmarès

1994 
UCI Road World Championships
1st  Junior Road Race
2nd Team Time Trial
2nd Overall Essen Etappenfahrt
3rd Overall Tour de Bretagne
3rd Overall Tour du Finistère

1996 
2nd U23 Road Race, UEC European Road Championships
3rd Trofeo Alfredo Binda

1997 
1st  U23 Time Trial, UEC European Road Championships
2nd Vertemate con Minoprio

1998 
1st  Overall UCI Women's Road World Cup
1st  Road Race, UCI Road World Championships
UEC European Road Championships
1st  U23 Time Trial
2nd U23 Road Race
National Road Championships
1st  Road Race
2nd Time Trial
1st Rotterdam Tour
1st Ottawa
1st Ladies Tour Beneden Maas
1st Stage 3 Giro d'Italia Femminile
2nd Liberty Classic
3rd Overall Women's Challenge
1st Stage 3
3rd Trophée International de Saint-Amand-Mont-Rond

1999 
1st  Road Race, National Road Championships
1st  Overall Tour de France Feminine
3rd Road Race, UCI Road World Championships

2000 
1st  Overall UCI Women's Road World Cup
1st  Overall Vuelta Ciclista a Navarra
1st Stages 1, 2, 3 & 4
1st Primavera Rosa
1st Le Critérium International Féminin De Lachine
1st GP Ouest France,
1st Stage 3 Giro d'Italia Femminile
2nd Overall Women's Challenge
1st Stages 3 & 6
2nd Liberty Classic
Olympic Games
3rd Road Race
9th Time Trial
3rd La Coupe du Monde Cycliste Féminine de Montréal
4th La Flèche Wallonne

2001 
2nd Overall Giro d'Italia Femminile
1st Stage 13
2nd Overall Holland Ladies Tour
2nd Berner Rundfahrt
2nd Souvenir Magali Pache
3rd Trofeo Alfredo Binda
8th Road Race, UCI Road World Championships

2002 
1st Stage 9 Women's Challenge
2nd Primavera Rosa
3rd Overall Giro d'Italia Femminile

2003 
National Road Championships
1st  Road Race 
2nd Time Trial
1st Trofeo Alfredo Binda
1st Rund um die Nürnberger Altstadt
1st Stages 1, 2 & 7 Holland Ladies Tour
1st Stage 3 Le Tour du Grand Montréal
2nd GP Carnevale d'Europa
2nd Rotterdam Tour

2004 
National Road Championships
1st  Road Race 
1st  Time Trial
1st Prologue & Stage 6 Giro d'Italia Femminile

2006 
1st  Road Race, National Road Championships
1st GP Liberazione
1st Prologue, Stage 1, 5, 6, & 7 Route de France Féminine
1st Prologue & Stage 1 Giro di San Marino
2nd Giro del Lago Maggiore
2nd Coppa dei Laghi
2nd Trofeo Alfredo Binda
2nd GP Carnevale d'Europa
8th Rotterdam Tour

2007 
1st  Overall Tour de Prince Edward Island
1st Stage 2
1st Stage 1 Tour Cycliste Féminin Ardèche Sud Rhone Alpes
1st Stage 4b Giro della Toscana Int. Femminile
2nd Road Race, National Road Championships

2008 
1st Giornata Rosa di Nove
1st GP Carnevale d'Europa
1st Stages 1, 2b & 3 Grande Boucle Féminine Internationale
1st Stages 3 & 5 Tour Cycliste Féminin Ardèche Sud Rhone Alpes
2nd Time Trial, National Road Championships
3rd Trofeo Alfredo Binda
6th Road Race, UCI Road World Championships

2009 
National Road Championships
1st  Time Trial
2nd Road Race 
1st  Overall Trophée d'Or Féminin
1st Stages 2, 3, & 6
1st  Overall Giro della Toscana Int. Femminile
1st Prologue Route de France Féminine
5th Road Race, UCI Road World Championships
9th GP Ouest France

Photo gallery

External links

Diana Ziliute's web site 
Diana Ziliute's team 

1976 births
Living people
Lithuanian female cyclists
Cyclists at the 1996 Summer Olympics
Cyclists at the 2000 Summer Olympics
Olympic cyclists of Lithuania
Olympic bronze medalists for Lithuania
UCI Road World Champions (women)
People from Rietavas
Olympic medalists in cycling
Lithuanian Sportsperson of the Year winners
Medalists at the 2000 Summer Olympics